Tim Lindquist is the founder of multiple video game publications including Hardcore Gamer Magazine and Onionbat Books (formerly DoubleJump Books). DoubleJump Books is a strategy guide publisher responsible for the guides of games such as Disgaea: Hour of Darkness and Genji: Dawn of the Samurai. He founded Hardcore Gamer Magazine in 2005, which ran for 36 issues and has since spawned a website. Before DoubleJump Books, he co-founded GameFan with Dave Halverson and Greg Off. Tim Lindquist has also been a part of other publications such as PSExtreme, Q64 and Dimension 3. Besides his involvement in publishing, Tim has been a member of the MAME development team since 1997.

Tim also appears as a merchant in the game King's Field III.

External links
Hardcore Gamer Magazine
Onionbat Books (formerly DoubleJump Books)

Living people
Year of birth missing (living people)
Magazine publishers (people)